Tucker Wiard (November 10, 1941 – August 28, 2022) was an American television editor. He won five Primetime Emmy Awards and was nominated for six more in the category Outstanding Picture Editing. Wiard died in August 2022, of complications from heart failure in Los Angeles, California, at the age of 80.

References

External links 

1941 births
2022 deaths
American television editors
Michigan State University alumni
Primetime Emmy Award winners
Writers from Detroit